Danie Joubert (8 February 1909 – 2 March 1997) was a South African sprinter. He competed in the men's 100 metres at the 1932 Summer Olympics.

References

1909 births
1997 deaths
People from Endumeni Local Municipality
Colony of Natal people
Athletes (track and field) at the 1932 Summer Olympics
South African male sprinters
Olympic athletes of South Africa